Up to Something may refer to:
 "Up to Something" by Metro Boomin from Not All Heroes Wear Capes
 "Up to Something" by Naaz from Bits of Naaz